The 2017–18 VfL Bochum season is the 80th season in club history.

Review and events
On 11 July 2017 head coach Gertjan Verbeek was sacked and replaced by Ismail Atalan. On 9 October 2017 head coach Ismail Atalan was sacked and replaced by caretaker Jens Rasiejewski. Rasiejewski's tenure as caretaker ended on 8 December 2017, when he was appointed as head coach by athletic director Christian Hochstätter. On 7 February 2018 the supervisory board sacked both Christian Hochstätter and Jens Rasiejewski. Heiko Butscher took over as caretaker. On 11 February 2018 the VfL Bochum announced signing Robin Dutt as head coach.

Matches

Legend

Friendly matches

2. Bundesliga

League table

Results summary

Results by round

Matches

DFB-Pokal

Squad

Squad and statistics

Squad, appearances and goals scored

|}

Transfers

Summer

In:

Out:

Winter

In:

Out:

Sources

External links
 2017–18 VfL Bochum season at Weltfussball.de 
 2017–18 VfL Bochum season at kicker.de 
 2017–18 VfL Bochum season at Fussballdaten.de 

Bochum
VfL Bochum seasons